Tirunnavaya railway station  is the railway station located at Edakkulam-Tirunavaya, Malappuram, Kerala. The station code of Tirunnavaya is TUA (Code:TUA). It comes under the Palakkad Railway Division of the Southern Railway. It is the third largest railway station in the Malappuram district, this is the oldest railway station in Kerala. It is a major railway station serving the town of Tirunavaya and Puthanathani in Malappuram district of Kerala.

History
The place is located on the banks of the Nila River. Tirunavaya Railway Station is located at Edakulam in Tirunavaya Grama Panchayat. Many years ago, Edakkulam was the largest trading center in the panchayat. This area played an important role in the Malabar Rebellion (1921) during the freedom struggle. Protesters were imprisoned by British troops at the site.
When Hermann Gundert arrived at the Edakulam railway station from Kozhikode, he was brought to Kodakal in a bullock cart by a man named Puzhakkal Mohammad. When Thavanur Manakkal Vasudevan was a member of the Namboothiri District Board, the Edakulam railway station was renamed Tirunavaya.

Passing trains
Trains that pass through Tirunavaya Railway station 
Cannanore Exp, Alleppey Exp
Cannanore Exp, Alappuzha Exp, 
Cbe-maq Passenger, 
Maq-cbe Fast Pass., 
Can-cbe Passenger

Service trains 
Trains stopping at Thirunavaya railway station.

Goods shed
The Southern Railway opened goods shed at the Thirunavaya station to facilitate smooth loading and unloading.
the loading and unloading work would involve frequent shunting of goods wagons, which may cause closure of the adjacent level-crossing gate for enhanced durations.

Features 
Thirunavaya railway station is located between Tirur railway station and Kuttipuram station. It is six meters above sea level. There are two platforms with electrified tracks. Fourteen trains stop here.

See also
 Mangalore Mail
 Tirur
 Malappuram
 Malappuram district
 Transportation in Malappuram district
 Tirunavaya
 Puthanathani

References

External links
https://www.thehindu.com/news/cities/kozhikode/guruvayur-thirunavaya-railway-line-project-in-focus-again/article27473510.ece
https://www.thehindu.com/news/cities/kozhikode/special-project-sought-for-malabars-development/article34077639.ece
https://www.thehindu.com/news/national/kerala/semi-high-speed-rail-to-take-a-new-track/article28129844.ece

Railway stations in Malappuram district
Palakkad railway division
Railway stations opened in 1861
1861 establishments in British India